The 2022–23 CESAFI season is be the 23rd season of the Cebu Schools Athletic Foundation, Inc., the preeminent inter-scholastic sports competition in Cebu.

This season marks the return of the physical events of the CESAFI, which because of the COVID-19 pandemic had held its two previous seasons virtually. The season will mark the first appearance of University of the Philippines Cebu (UP Cebu) as a regular member. Aside from UP Cebu, the Sisters of Mary–Boystown and City of Bogo Science and Arts Academy will both compete in the high school division in select events as guest members. Southwestern University will take a leave of absence for this season, citing a lack of budget for its sports teams.

The season is set to open on October 15, 2022.

Sports calendar
This is the calendar of sports events of the 2022–23 CESAFI season. The list includes the tournament duration and the venues.

Basketball
Six teams will play in the college division, while ten teams will play in the high school division. Southwestern University (SWU) Cobras will not take part for this season, taking a leave for absence. University of the Philippines Cebu (UP Cebu) Fighting Maroons, which was supposed to play its first season in the CESAFI, withdrew its teams in college and high school basketball, citing a need for more time to field a more competitive team.

College tournament
In the college division, the six (6) teams will play each other twice in a double round-robin tournament for the elimination round for a total of ten (10) games for each team. The top four (4) teams will advance to the Final Four. Originally, seven (7) teams were supposed to compete, until the withdrawal of UP Cebu.

Elimination round

Team standings

Results
Results on top and to the right of the gray cells are from first-round games; those to the bottom and to the left of it are from second-round games.

Bracket

Semifinals
The top 2 teams will have the twice-to-beat advantage; with them having to win only once, and their opponents twice, to advance.

UV vs USJR

USPF vs UC

Finals
The Finals is a best-of-three playoff.

Awards

High school tournament
In the high school division, the ten (10) teams will play each other once in a single round-robin tournament for the elimination round for a total of nine (9) games for each team. The top four (4) teams will advance to the Final Four. Originally, eleven (11) teams were supposed to compete, until the withdrawal of UP Cebu.
 
This marks the debut of the City of Bogo Science and Arts Academy (CBSAA) Trailblazers from Bogo, Cebu as a guest team.

Elimination round

Team standings

Results

Bracket

Semifinals
The top 2 teams will have the twice-to-beat advantage; with them having to win only once, and their opponents twice, to advance.

CBSAA vs UV

SHS-AdC vs UC

Finals
The Finals is a best-of-three playoff.

Awards

Volleyball
There will be 9 schools in the College Division (Both Men & Women)

Men's
 Cebu Doctors University
 Cebu Institute of Technology University
 University of Cebu
 University of Cebu - Lapu-Lapu & Mandaue Campus
 University of the Philippines Cebu
 University of the Visayas 
 University of San Carlos 
 University of San Jose-Recoletos
 University of Southern Philippines Foundation

Women's
 Cebu Doctors University
 Cebu Institute of Technology University
 University of Cebu 
 University of Cebu - Lapu-Lapu & Mandaue Campus 
 University of the Philippines Cebu 
 University of the Visayas 
 University of San Carlos 
 University of San Jose-Recoletos 
 University of Southern Philippines Foundation

Football
There will be 4 teams in both High School & College Divisions This Season.

High School
 Don Bosco Technology Center
 Sacred Heart School-Ateneo de Cebu
 University of San Carlos
 University of San Jose-Recoletos

College
 University of Cebu
 University of San Carlos
 University of San Jose-Recoletos
 University of Southern Philippines Foundation

References

External links
 

2022–23 in Philippine college basketball
Current basketball seasons
2022 in Philippine sport
2023 in Philippine sport